China Northern Swan Airlines was an airline based in China, it was a subsidiary of China Northern Airlines.

History
China Northern Swan Airlines was founded in 1990, it operated McDonnell Douglas MD-80s leased from China Northern Airlines, it was acquired by China Southern Airlines in 2003 followed by Beiya Airlines, China Northern Airlines, and Zhongyuan Airlines.

Acquisition of Swan Airlines
Swan Airlines was an airline based in China, it was taken over by China Northern Airlines and renamed to China Northern Swan Airlines.

Fleet
China Northern Swan Airlines operated leased aircraft from China Northern Airlines such as a leased MD-82.

References

Defunct airlines of China
Airlines established in 1990
Chinese companies established in 1990
Airlines disestablished in 2003
2003 disestablishments in China